is a department store chain that operates an extensive network of branches in Japan. It once owned stores in locations as diverse as Beijing in China, Causeway Bay in Hong Kong, Taipei in Taiwan, Jakarta and Surabaya in Indonesia, Kuala Lumpur in Malaysia, Singapore, Bangkok in Thailand, London in United Kingdom, but most of these international branches are now closed or operated by independent franchisees.

History

Sogo was founded in 1830 in Osaka by Ihei Sogo as a retailer of used kimono.

In July 2000, the company faced financial troubles caused by the unstable real estate investment policy of the former chairman, Hiroo Mizushima, and the collapse of Japanese real estate prices since the mid-1980s. The group collapsed under a debt mountain of US$17 billion, owed principally to Industrial Bank of Japan. Sogo applied to Osaka District Court under the Civil Rehabilitation Law on July 12, 2000. It has had to divest itself of unprofitable business lines, as well as valuable assets such as several stores in Japan (e.g., Kokura and Kurosaki) and some overseas stores, including ones in Singapore, Kuala Lumpur, Hong Kong and Taipei.

Other overseas Sogo stores survived under independent franchises, through which the Japanese company has also managed to raise capital.

In Japan, Sogo is a subsidiary of Millennium Retailing (now renamed as Sogo & Seibu).

The Sogo logo
Since its founding in 1830 Sogo has used as their logo, the family crest ( mon (emblem) ) of a silk shop. The logo consists of a circle with a shape inside that depicts winding the warp on a loom (called 'chikiri' in Japanese), a nod to the company's origin as a second-hand kimono shop. The word 'Chikiri' in Japanese, also relates to the act of taking a vow or promise.

Locations

Japan
As of 2018, Sogo Department Store has locations in Yokohama, Chiba, Hiroshima, Omiya, Kawaguchi, Seishin and Tokushima.

August 2020, Sogo closed its stores in Seishin and Tokushima, followed by the closing of the Kawaguchi store on February 2021 due to declining sales.

China
Sogo Department stores in China are operated by Taiwan-based Pacific Sogo. Stores are located in Beijing, three in Shanghai, two in Chengdu, two in Chongqing and one in Dalian, as of August 2007. It appears that all of the branches have shut down.

Jiuguang Department Store
In 2004, Jiuguang Department Store in Shanghai was opened as a joint venture between Lifestyle International Holdings of Hong Kong, the owner of Sogo Hong Kong and the state-owned Joinbuy Group of Shanghai. The department store is located in the fashionable Jing'an District adjacent to the Jing'an Temple, on West Nanjing Road. The store operation is a clone of the Sogo in Hong Kong including the high-end supermarket Freshmart and Beaute @ Jiuguang (instead of Beaute @ Sogo).

The store also brought in some very exclusive designers, a lot of which had their first counter in Mainland China such as Thomas Pink, Jean Paul Gaultier and Vivienne Westwood. Currently, besides Shanghai, Jiuguang also opened in Suzhou and Dailan.

Hong Kong

The Causeway Bay store on Hong Kong Island opened in 1985. The store itself was colloquially referred as "Jumbo Sogo" after its subsequent expansion.
Following Sogo Group's collapse and bankruptcy in Japan after the Asian financial crisis, Sogo Hong Kong, including the 40,500-square-meter retail property located in Causeway Bay, was sold for US$453.6 million to two local billionaires, Thomas Lau of Chinese Estates and Henry Cheng of Chow Tai Fook Enterprises. The new owners took Sogo public with the help of Lifestyle International in 2004.

Sogo Hong Kong Co. Ltd, the Sogo franchisee, now operates one additional store in Tsim Sha Tsui, which opened on September 30, 2005, marking the 25th anniversary of Sogo in Hong Kong. The Causeway Bay store added an large extension, which opened on November 22, 1993. The enlarged store carries items in all product categories across the 15-story building. It includes the Sogo Club, Sogo Book club, and a new annex building named Beauté by Sogo. The Tsim Sha Tsui branch focuses on designer fashions.

Lifestyle International Holdings Limited, the holding company of SOGO, was listed on The Stock Exchange of Hong Kong Limited on 15 April 2004. It is a member of the International Association of department stores.

Indonesia
In Indonesia, Sogo is operated by PT Mitra Adiperkasa Tbk (which also operates Sogo's sister department store chain Seibu). The first Indonesia Sogo store was opened in 1990 at Plaza Indonesia. The store was later closed in February 2006 due to the renovation of the shopping mall. The Sogo flagship store and management office were moved to Plaza Senayan, currently the largest store with six levels. All stores are located in high-end shopping malls in Indonesia, listed below.

PT. Mitra Adiperkasa Tbk., synonymously known as MAP, also operated supermarket The Foodhall, previously known as Sogo Supermarket. The Sogo Supermarket brand, introduced in Plaza Indonesia since its opening in 1990, has been phased out progressively with the introduction of the Sogo Foodhall as a modern supermarket concept, before renaming it into The Foodhall Gourmet as Sogo Plaza Indonesia closed down. The first new concept store opened in 2005 in conjunction with the opening of its Pondok Indah Mall branch, and eventually evolved into The Foodhall today. The supermarket that operated as part of Sogo are located below.

The Foodhall is also located in Senayan City (as part of now closed Debenhams department store), Grand Indonesia (as part of Seibu department store), and Central Park's extension, Neo Soho Mall. Other branches of The Foodhall are either standalone, operating independently inside a mall without any MAP-operated department stores, or operated under Daily Foodhall brand. Unlike The Foodhall for upper-class consumers, Daily Foodhall is operated for middle-class consumers. Daily Foodhall opened as part of Sogo on Paris Van Java in 2014, despite located in its extension.

Sogo stores that didn't include the supermarket are listed below:

Some stores also feature Planet Sports, Kidz Station (both MAP's inhouse brands) and Chatterbox Cafe. A Books Kinokuniya store was used to be located in the upper level of Sogo Plaza Senayan as its Indonesian flagship store, but closed on April 1, 2021.

Malaysia
SOGO presently has three stores in Malaysia. The first store, known as KL SOGO, is located along Jalan Tuanku Abdul Rahman in downtown Kuala Lumpur. Connected to the Bandaraya LRT station by a link bridge, it sits on the site formerly occupied by Suleiman Courts. The SOGO store commenced business on 18 January 1994. It has a basement parking for visitors to park their car (SOGO KL parking rate)

Sogo's second store in Malaysia, located at the Central i-City shopping mall in Padang Jawa, Shah Alam, opened on 11 April 2019, followed by the third store at The Mall - Midvalley Southkey in Johor Bahru, opened on 23 April 2019.

The operator, Sogo (KL) Department Store Sdn Bhd, also announced plans to open new stores in Paragon @ KL Northgate in Selayang, and GEM Megamall in Seberang Perai, Penang. It also plans to open a Seibu store in Tun Razak Exchange (TRX) Lifestyle Quarter in Kuala Lumpur.

SOGO also has been appointed to manage the operations of Mayang Mall in Kuala Terengganu, as well as becoming the mall's anchor tenant.

Singapore
Once located at one of the busiest shopping centres, Raffles City, the Singapore flagship store was closed in 2000 due to the bankruptcy of Sogo Japan. The space has since been occupied by Singapore's Robinsons. Sogo also once anchored Orchard Road's Paragon and DBS Building in Tampines. The DBS Building is now Tampines One, while Metro replaces Sogo in Paragon.

Taiwan

In Taiwan, Far East Sogo, as a part of Far East Group operates 8 stores. The oldest of these is located at Zhongxiao Fuxing Station in Taipei.

In 2006 Pacific Sogo found itself in the midst of a corruption scandal over gift certificates involving the family of Taiwan's former President Chen Shui-Bian. In October 2006, Wu Shu-chen (the former President's wife) was cleared by court of accepting vouchers from Pacific Sogo in return for her influence.

Due to its ownership, Pacific Sogo brand was renamed into Far East Sogo in 2016, while the corporate name is still named Pacific SOGO Department Stores Co., Ltd. The company targeted Far East Sogo for middle-up to high-end customers, alongside its flagship brand, Far Eastern Department Stores, targeted for low-middle and middle customers, and The Mall, targeted for high-end customers.

Kuang San Sogo, located in Taichung, is not related to Pacific Sogo.

Gallery

See also
Seibu Department Stores, another subsidiary of Millennium Retailing
Seven & I Holdings Co., Ltd.

References

External links

 Millennium Retailing
 SOGO Hong Kong
 Pacific SOGO Taiwan (Taipei, Chungli, Hsinchu, Kaoshiung)
 Kuan San SOGO Taiwan (Taichung)
 SOGO Indonesia, PT. Mitra Adiperkasa Tbk.
 SOGO Kuala Lumpur (KL SOGO), Malaysia
 SOGO Vietnam
 SOGO Web Directory

Department stores of Japan
Retail companies based in Tokyo
Department stores of Hong Kong
Department stores of Indonesia
Department stores of Malaysia
Department stores of Taiwan
Retail companies established in 1830
Companies formerly listed on the Tokyo Stock Exchange
Japanese companies established in 1830